A big man is a highly influential individual in a tribe, especially in Melanesia and Polynesia. Such a person may not have formal tribal or other authority (through for instance material possessions, or inheritance of rights), but can maintain recognition through skilled persuasion and wisdom. The big man has a large group of followers, both from his clan and from other clans. He provides his followers with protection and economic assistance, in return receiving support which he uses to increase his status.

Big man "system"

The American anthropologist Marshall Sahlins has studied the big man phenomenon. In his much-quoted 
1963 article  "Poor Man, Rich Man, Big Man, Chief: Political Types in Melanesia", Sahlins uses analytically constructed ideal-types of hierarchy and equality to compare a larger-scale Polynesian-type hierarchical society of chiefs and sub-chiefs with a Melanesian-type big-man system.

The latter consists of segmented lineage groups, locally held together by faction-leaders who compete for power in the social structure of horizontally arranged and principally equal groupings (factions). Here, leadership is not ascribed, but rather gained through action and competition "with other ambitious men".

Position

A big man's position is never secured in an inherited position at the top of a hierarchy, but is always challenged by the different big men who compete with one another in an ongoing process of reciprocity and re-distribution of material and political resources. As such the big man is subject to a transactional order based on his ability to balance the simultaneously opposing pulls of securing his own renown through distributing resources to other big man groups (thereby spreading the word of his power and abilities) and redistributing resources to the people of his own faction (thereby keeping them content followers of his able leadership).

The big man concept is relatively fluid, and formal authority of such figures is very low to nonexistent. His position is not inherently heritable.

In the Island of Malaita in Solomon Islands the big man system is dying away as westernization is influencing the people, but the big man system can be seen at the political level. Every four years in the Solomon Islands' National Elections the system can be clearly seen among the people, especially in the Melanesian Islands.

System in Papua New Guinea
The first use of the term may be found in the English-translation of Dreißig Jahre in der Südsee (1907) by Richard Parkinson. The term may be often found in many historical works dealing with Papua New Guinea. Andrew Strathern applies the concept of big-men to a community in Mount Hagen, Papua New Guinea.

Traditionally, among peoples of non-Austronesian-speaking communities, authority was obtained by a man (the so-called "big man") recognised as "performing most capably in social, political, economic and ceremonial activities". His function was not to command, but to influence his society through his example. He was expected to act as a negotiator with neighbouring groups, and to periodically redistribute food (generally produced by his wives). In this sense, he was seen as ensuring the well-being of his community.

Such a system is still found in many parts of Papua New Guinea, and other parts of Melanesia.

See also
Big man (political science)
Elder (administrative title)
Moka exchange
Monarchy
Rom baro
Ulmen (Mapuche)

References

Further reading
"The Big Men: Chris Bowler, Ben Smyth, Alex Thomas, and John Zhang." Essay by John Zhang in the 18th issue of Scroop.

Politics of the Solomon Islands
Politics of Vanuatu
Politics of Papua New Guinea
Anthropology
Narcissism
Bislama words and phrases
Political anthropology